Joypur (also spelled Jaypur, Jaipur) is a village, with a police station, in the Joypur CD block in the Bishnupur subdivision of the Bankura district  in the state of West Bengal, India.

Geography

Location

Area overview
The map alongside shows the Bishnupur subdivision of Bankura district. Physiographically, this area has fertile low lying alluvial plains. It is a predominantly rural area with 90.06% of the population living in rural areas and only 8.94% living in the urban areas. It was a part of the core area of Mallabhum.

Note: The map alongside presents some of the notable locations in the subdivision. All places marked in the map are linked in the larger full screen map.

Demographics
According to the 2011 Census of India, Joypur had a total population of 3,136 of which 1,588 (51%) were males and 1,548 (49%) were females. Population below 6 years was 317. The total number of literates in Joypur was 2,173 (77.08% of the population over 6 years).

Civic administration

Police station
Joypur police station has jurisdiction over Joypur  CD block. The area covered is 262.74 km2 with a population of 139,693.

CD block HQ
The headquarters of Joypur CD block are located at Joypur.

Transport
State Highway 2 (West Bengal) running from Bankura to Malancha (in North 24 Parganas district) passes through Joypur.

Education
Joypur B.Ed. College is a private non-aided college. It is affiliated to the University of Burdwan and offers courses leading to the Bachelor of Education degree. Method subjects taught are: Bengali, English, Sanskrit, history and geography.

Joypur High School is a Bengali-medium coeducational institution established in 1962. It has facilities for teaching from class V to class XII. The school has 14 computers, a library with 1,700 books and a playground.

Joypur Madhyamik Balika Vidyalaya is a Bengali-medium girls only institution established in 2000. It has facilities for teaching from class V to class X. The school has 9 computers, a library with 400 books and a playground.

Joypur picture gallery

Healthcare
Joypur Block Primary Health Centre, with 15 beds at Joypur, is the major government medical facility in the Joypur CD block. There are primary health centres at Hijaldiha (with 10 beds), Uttarbar (Magura) (with 10 beds), Hetia (panchayat management) (with 6 beds) and Jagannathpur (with 10 beds).

References

External links

Villages in Bankura district
Tourist attractions in Bankura district